Parvenets is a village in the Plovdiv Province, Southern Bulgaria. It is part of the Rodopi municipality. As 2008, the village has 3,463 inhabitants.

Geography 
Parvenets has a strategic situation on the Varlishtitsa River and lies at only 10 km to the south of Plovdiv. It borders the villages of Markovo, Brestovitsa, Hrabrino and the city of Plovdiv (Komatevo neighbourhood) which is at 3 km. The village is situated at an altitude of 433m.

History 

Parvenets has a rich history. From the Antiquity and the Middle Ages and especially during the Bulgarian National Revival the village is a centre of rich economic and cultural life. During the different periods it was called Varlovo, Dermendere, Ferdinandovo.

Around 1700 St Fotinia Church was constructed. In 1846 the Gyumyushgerdan brothers inaugurate the second factory in Bulgaria and in the beginning of the 20th century the village was a centre of intense agriculture which accelerated the local commerce. Parvenets is connected with the Unification of Bulgaria with Eastern Rumelia in 1885. On 25 and 26 July 1885 during the meeting of the Bulgarian Secret Central Revolution Committee (BSCRC) in the village Zahari Stoyanov was chosen a new chairman and the decision for the Unification was taken.

Notes

External links 
 Hear the history of the village of Parvenets (in Bulgarian, MP3-format)

Villages in Plovdiv Province